Somewhere over the Slaughterhouse is the sixth studio album by Buckethead. To date it is his only solo album to be released as both a CD and LP and is currently out of print. Problems with rights ownership make a reissue unlikely. A download can be obtained at TDRS Music.

Track listing

Personnel
Performers
Buckethead — acoustic guitar, electric guitar, bass guitar
P-Sticks - electronic programming, drum programming, tape effects, artwork

Production
Recorded in the kitchen at Pilo's Loft, and track three recorded at Travis Dickerson's recording studio.
Mastered by Travis Dickerson at Travis Dickerson Recording Studio, Chatsworth, California.

Notes
 "My Sheeetz" and "Day of the Ulcer" have virtually the same drum beat. The only distinct difference is that on "Day of the Ulcer" the drumbeat is digitally slowed down.

"Somewhere over the Slaughterhouse"

The title track features an intentionally mangled rendition of the song  "Over the Rainbow", popularly known as "Somewhere over the Rainbow", from the 1939 movie The Wizard of Oz, as sung by the main character Dorothy Gale portrayed by Judy Garland. It is the inspiration for the title of the track, and thereby the album.

Credits
 Buckethead - acoustic guitar

References

2001 albums
Buckethead albums